Ironspot is an unincorporated community in Muskingum County, in the U.S. state of Ohio.

History
An original variant name was Beem City. Beem City was laid out in 1895 by John H. Beem, and named for him. The new name of Iron Spot was adopted ca. 1905. A post office called Ironspot was established in 1905, and remained in operation until 1923.

References

Unincorporated communities in Muskingum County, Ohio
1895 establishments in Ohio
Unincorporated communities in Ohio